Pyrausta comastis is a moth in the family Crambidae. This species is endemic to New Zealand. It has been classified as "nationally vulnerable" by the Department of Conservation.

Taxonomy 
It was first described by Edward Meyrick in 1884 and given the name Proteroeca comastis. In 1892 William Warren also described the same species but thinking it new gave it the name Ennychia intrudens. This name was subsequently synonymised by Michael Shaffer. George Vernon Hudson also gave a description and illustration of the species under the name Proteroeca comastis in 1928. In 1988 John S. Dugdale listed the species under the genus Loxostege. However the correct binomial nomenclature for this species is Pyrausta comastis.

Description 
This species was described by Meyrick as follows:

Distribution 
P. comastis is endemic to New Zealand. It can be found in the South Island. Meyrick stated that the species could be found at Castle Hill and Christchurch. Hudson added to the locality list and included Lake Rotoiti, Wedderburn and New River, near Invercargill. Philpott collected the species at Red Lake in the Mount Cook district. It has also been collected in the Dansey ecological district in Otago. It is present at higher elevations.

Life cycle and behaviour 
This species life history is unknown. Adults have been recorded on wing in December and in January.

Habitat 
This species has been collected in dry grassy areas and damp open habitats.

Conservation status
This moth is classified under the New Zealand Threat Classification system as being "nationally vulnerable".

References

Moths described in 1884
comastis
Moths of New Zealand
Endemic fauna of New Zealand
Taxa named by Edward Meyrick
Endangered biota of New Zealand
Endemic moths of New Zealand